Vladimir Kozlov (born 1979) is a Ukrainian-American professional wrestler. Other notable people named Vladimir Kozlov include:

 Vladimir Kozlov (bobsleigh) (born 1958), Soviet bobsledder
 Vladimir Kozlov (footballer) (born 1946), Soviet footballer
 Vladimir Kozlov (director) (born 1956), Belarusian film director and screenwriter
 Vladimir Kozlov (politician) (born 1960), Kazakh politician
 Vladimir Kozlov (speed skater) (born 1959), Soviet Olympic speed skater